BZF may refer to:

 BZF (airline), a Hong Kong passenger airline

See also 
 bzf, ISO 639-3 code of the Boiken language